Bishramganj is a small town and the headquarters of Sipahijala district in the Indian state of Tripura, situated about 35 km from the capital Agartala.

References

Cities and towns in Sipahijala district